Edward Martin Hurson (13 September 1956 – 13 July 1981) was an Irish Republican Hunger Striker and a Volunteer in the East Tyrone Brigade of the Provisional Irish Republican Army (IRA).

Background

Martin Hurson, from Cappagh, County Tyrone, Northern Ireland, was one of nine children born to Johnny and Mary Ann Hurson.

After leaving school, he worked as a welder for a while before going to England where he stayed for eighteen months with his brother Francis and worked in the building trade. Returning to County Tyrone at the end of 1974, both he and his brother spent time in Bundoran, County Donegal.

IRA activities
In November 1976, Martin, together with Kevin O’Brien, Dermot Boyle, Peter Kane and Pat O’Neill were arrested. Martin was tried and convicted of involvement in three IRA landmine incidents, one at Cappagh in September, one at Galbally, County Tyrone in November 1975 and a third at Reclain in February 1976, when several members of the Royal Ulster Constabulary and Ulster Defence Regiment narrowly escaped being killed. He received concurrent sentences of twenty, fifteen and five years for these convictions.

Hunger strike
Martin became engaged to his long-term girlfriend, Bernadette Donnelly, while in prison. He was part of the blanket protest and joined the 1981 hunger strike on 28 May, replacing Brendan McLaughlin who withdrew following a perforated stomach ulcer.

He lost the ability to hold down water after around 40 days on hunger strike, and died of dehydration after only 46 days, considerably shorter than the others (the next shortest was Francis Hughes at 59 days). Near the end, his family considered the possibility of intervening to save his life, but they were told that he would probably have permanent brain damage.

References

External links
Biography from IRIS, Vol. 1, No. 2, November 1981 (Sinn Féin publication)
Timeline of 1981 Hunger Strike (from NYU Library)

Stailc 81, 40th Anniversary of the 1981 Hunger Strike

1956 births
1981 deaths
Irish republicans
People from County Tyrone
People who died on the 1981 Irish hunger strike
Provisional Irish Republican Army members